Eric Jan Fygi (born October 16, 1941) is an American civil servant, lawyer, and political aide. He served as the Deputy General Counsel for the United States Department of Energy from the department's founding in October 1977 until 2022, serving for every President of the United States between Jimmy Carter and Joe Biden.

Early life and education 
Born in La Jolla, California, Fygi received his Bachelor of Arts in history from the Virginia Military Institute in 1963 and his Juris Doctor from the University of California, Hastings College of Law. He served on the Hastings Law Journal, was editor-in-chief of the Hastings Voir Dire newspaper, and as president of the student body association.

Career
Previously, Fygi served as the department's Acting General Counsel and worked for the United States Department of Health and Human Services before working in the Department of Energy.

Fygi was responsible for the emergency executive actions taken by President Bill Clinton and George W. Bush in January 2001 that prevented simultaneous collapse of natural gas and electricity service throughout Northern California following the bankruptcy of the region's major utility. As a result, Fygi testified before the United States Senate Committee on Banking, Housing, and Urban Affairs for the re-authorization of the Defense Production Act of 1950.

References

External links

 
 

1941 births
Living people
United States Department of Energy officials
American civil servants
American lawyers
People from La Jolla, San Diego